John Dowling (born 3 April 1953) is an Australian former rugby league footballer who played in the 1970s and 1980s.

Biography
Murwillumbah hooker came to Brisbane Easts in 1972 before joining Wynnum-Manly in 1974.
A Queensland rep against France in 1977, John Dowling ventured to the St. George Dragons in 1979 under the coaching of Harry Bath but missed the club's grand final success that year because of injury. Dowling played six seasons at St. George Dragons between 1979 and 1984. 

He went on to play in three Rugby League State of Origin matches for Queensland in 1982 before returning to Brisbane at the end of the 1984 season.
Dowling was Reserve grade coach under Craig Young at St. George in 1989–1990.

References

External links
Queensland representatives at qrl.com.au

1953 births
Australian rugby league players
Eastern Suburbs Tigers players
Queensland Rugby League State of Origin players
Wynnum Manly Seagulls players
St. George Dragons players
Living people
Rugby league hookers